Pico Simón Bolívar is the second highest mountain in Colombia, with an estimated height of . Pico Bolívar and the neighbouring summit of  Pico Cristóbal Colón  are the two highest peaks in Colombia and are very nearly equal in elevation. The difference in elevation is estimated to be only one or two metres. One or other of these peaks is therefore the fifth most prominent in the world (see list of peaks by prominence). There is a permanent snowcap on this peak and on the nearby mountains. It is part of the Sierra Nevada de Santa Marta range, along with Pico Cristóbal Colón. The peak is named after Simón Bolívar.

Climbing history
Pico Simón Bolívar was first climbed in 1939 by W. Wood, A. Bakerwell and E. Praolini.

Access to these mountains became very difficult after the early 1990s due to hostile locals, drug traffickers, and FARC guerillas. An expedition in 2015 was one of the first to climb in the range for many years, reaching the summit of Pico Cristóbal Colón.

See also
 List of mountains by elevation
 List of Ultras of South America

References

Simon Bolivar
Sierra Nevada de Santa Marta